The Peel Centre is a retail park located in Stockport, Greater Manchester. Nearby town centre shopping areas, include the Merseyway Shopping Centre.

History

The site on which the park stands has had a variety of different usages over time, it previously had industry and housing. It then contained a power station and gas works, and then had a variety of industrial usages, it was only developed in its current form from the late 1980s onwards. It was constructed in phases with the latter phases being those at the eastern side.

Controversy
There is extensive car parking at the centre where there has been controversy over wrongly issued parking fines,  it is mainly pay and display, and is close to the town's major supermarkets.

Nearby developments

Immediately adjacent to The Peel Centre, across the road is a smaller development, Portwood Court.

In 2003, IKEA announced plans to open a store on the other side of the Portwood Roundabout and M60, but were denied planning permission, and after numerous appeals they were finally turned down in 2005 by the then Deputy Prime Minister John Prescott.

References

Buildings and structures in Stockport
Shopping centres in Greater Manchester
Retail parks in the United Kingdom
The Peel Group